Armenians in Russia or Russian Armenians are one of the country's largest ethnic minorities and the largest Armenian diaspora community outside Armenia. The 2010 Russian census recorded 1,182,388 Armenians in the country. Various figures estimate that the ethnic Armenian population in Russia is actually more than 2 million. Armenians populate various regions, including Moscow, Saint Petersburg, Krasnodar Krai in the North Caucasus and as far as Vladivostok in the East.

History

Early period
There has been an Armenian presence in Russia since the Late Middle Ages, when various artisans, merchants and traders ventured west  to the Crimea and the northern Caucasus in order to set up trade ties and conduct commerce.

Russian Empire

The relationship between Armenians and Russian imperial authorities was complex, shaped as often by parallel interests as competing objectives. Large Armenian communities resided both in the Caucasus and in Russian cities well before the modern era. After the destruction of the last remaining independent Armenian states in the Middle Ages, the nobility disintegrated, leaving Armenian society composed of a mass of peasants plus a middle class who were either craftsmen or merchants. Such Armenians were to be found in most towns of Transcaucasia; indeed, at the beginning of the 19th century they formed the majority of the population in cities such as Tbilisi. Armenian merchants conducted their trade across the world and many had set up base within Russia. In 1778, Catherine the Great invited Armenian merchants from the Crimea to Russia and they established a settlement at Nor Nakhichevan near Rostov-on-Don. The Russian ruling classes welcomed the Armenians' entrepreneurial skills as a boost to the economy, but they also regarded them with some suspicion. The image of the Armenian as a "wily merchant" was already widespread. Russian nobles derived their income from their estates worked by serfs and, with their aristocratic distaste for engaging in business, they had little understanding or sympathy for the way of life of mercantile Armenians.

Nevertheless, middle-class Armenians prospered under Russian rule and they were the first to seize the new opportunities and transform themselves into a prosperous bourgeoisie when capitalism and industrialisation came to Transcaucasia in the later half of the 19th century. The Armenians more easily adapted to the new economic circumstances than their neighbours in Transcaucasia, the Georgians and the Azeris. They became the most powerful element in the municipal life of Tbilisi, the heart of the tsarist administration of the Caucasus as well as its economic center. Armenian entrepreneurs were quick to engage the oil boom which began in Transcaucasia in the 1870s, making investments in the oil fields in Baku in Azerbaijan and the refineries of Batumi on the Black Sea coast. All this meant that the tensions between Armenians, Georgians and Azeris in Russian Transcaucasia were not simply ethnic or religious in nature but also were shaped by social and economic considerations. Nevertheless, despite the stereotype of the typical Armenian as a successful businessman, at the end of the 19th century 80 percent of Russian Armenians were still peasants working the land.

Present Day

According to the Union of Russian Armenians, there are 2.5 million Armenians living in Russia today. According to the same source, about 850,000 are immigrants from Armenia, 350,000 from Azerbaijan and 250,000 from Georgia, including 100,000 from Abkhazia and 180,000 from Central Asia, mostly Tajikistan and Turkmenistan.

The Russian government is encouraging Armenians to immigrate and settle in Russia and is providing financial and settlement incentives.

Armenians in Russia have one of the highest rates of educational attainment. According to the 2002 census 21.4% of Armenians have higher education, 31.8% have "middle special" education (i.e. vocational education), and 46.1% have secondary education.

Distribution

Moscow

The 2010 Russian census put the number of Moscow Armenians at 106,466. Another 63,306 Armenians lived in Moscow region at the time. There are various estimates on the number of Armenians in Moscow: 400,000, 600,000, 1,000,000. Moscow is often regarded as the largest Armenian community outside Armenia.

Saint Petersburg 
In 1708 the first Armenians came to St. Petersburg, and in 1710 in the city already existed "Armenian offices". In 1730, under the leadership of the priest Ivan Sheristanova organized the first parish of the Armenian Apostolic Church.
Throughout the 20th century Armenian population of St. Petersburg has been steadily increasing. The number of Armenians in St. Petersburg increased from 1,759 in 1926 to 19,164 in 2002.

According to Soviet 1989 census 47% Armenians speak Armenian as native language, 52% speak Russian as native language. At the same time almost all fluent in Russian language. About half of the Armenians have higher education and, consequently, higher social status.

According to the head of Saint Petersburg's Armenian community Karen Mkrtchyan, currently about 100,000 Armenians are living in the region of Saint Petersburg. There are 2 Armenian churches, a Sunday school, "Havatamk" Armenian monthly and a printing house.

Krasnodar

The Krasnodar Krai is one of the biggest communities of the Armenian diaspora. According to the Russian 2002 census, there were 274,566 Armenians. 211,397 of them spoke Armenian as their native language and 6,948 had Armenian citizenship.

According to estimates some 500,000, 700,000 or 1,000,000 Armenians resided in Krasnodar.

They are chiefly concentrated in Greater Sochi (80,045–125,000) the city of Krasnodar (28,022–70,000), the city of Armavir (18,262–50,000) Tuapse (18,194), Novorossiysk (12,092–40,000) Apsheron (10,659), and Anapa (8,201).

Rostov-on-Don
Historically, the Don region was home to the largest Armenian community on the territory of the modern Russian Federation. Armenians were resettled from Crimean Khanate in 1779 by orders of Catherine the Great and founded several settlements around the territory of modern Rostov-on-Don. The largest of them, Nakhichevan-on-Don, was merged into the Rostov city in 1928. Armenians still constitute the majority (60%) of population in Myasnikovsky District. In 2010, Rostov-on-Don had the third largest Armenian population of all Russian cities (after Moscow and Sochi, Krasnodar Krai).

Notable Russian Armenians

Arts and entertainment

Ivan Aivazovsky (1817–1900), painter, one of the greatest masters of marine art
Yuri Kasparyan (b. 1963), former Guitarist of Kino
Irina Allegrova (b. 1952), pop singer 
Artsvik (b. 1984), pop singer
Lev Atamanov (1905–1981), director of Soyuzmultfilm animation studio
Arno Babajanian (1921–1983), composer and pianist
Armen Dzhigarkhanyan (1935–2020), actor, appeared in more films than any other Russian actor
Karina Evn (b. 1997), singer-songwriter
Sergey Galoyan (b. 1981), music producer
Mikhail Galustyan (b. 1979), comedian and showman
Armen Grigoryan (b. 1960), singer songwriter
Luara Hayrapetyan (b. 1997), singer-songwriter
Artur Janibekyan (b. 1976), co-producer of Comedy Club
Karen Kavaleryan (b. 1961), lyricist of Eurovision songs
Edmond Keosayan (1936–1994), film director
Tigran Keosayan (b. 1966), film director, actor and writer
Aram Khachaturian (1903–1978), classical composer, one of the titans of Soviet classical music
Dmitry Kharatyan (b. 1960), actor
Philipp Kirkorov (b. 1967), singer, king of Russian pop
Arshak Makichyan, violinist and activist who is called the Russian Greta Thunberg
Garik Martirosyan (b. 1974), comedian, co-producer of Comedy Club
Frunzik Mkrtchyan (1930–1993), actor
Stas Namin (b. 1951), rock singer 
, pianist and conductor 
Sergei Parajanov (1924–1990), film director, significantly contributed to Soviet cinema
Yevgeny Petrosyan (b. 1945), comedian
Eva Rivas (b. 1987), pop singer, represented Armenia in Eurovision 2010
Avraam Russo (b. 1969), pop singer
Igor Sarukhanov (b. 1956), rock singer 
Martiros Saryan (1880–1972), painter
Karen Shakhnazarov (b. 1952), filmmaker, producer, director of Mosfilm since 1998
Mikael Tariverdiev (1931–1996), composer
Akim Tamiroff (1899–1972), actor
Agrippina Vaganova (1879–1951), ballet teacher
Yevgeny Vakhtangov (1883–1922), actor and theatre director
Lousine Gevorkyan (b. 1982), rock singer

Politics and military

Sergey Aganov (1917–1996), Marshal of Engineer Troops
Sergei Avakyants (b. 1957), admiral, commander of the Pacific Fleet
Hamazasp Babadzhanian (1906–1977), Chief Marshal of the Armoured Forces, Soviet Tank Forces
 (b. 1967), politician, journalist, TV presenter
Ivan Bagramyan (1897–1982), Marshal of the Soviet Union
Vasili Bebutov (1791–1858), Adjutant General of the H.I.M. Retinue, General of the Infantry
Aleksandr Chupriyan (b. 1958), political military commander, interim Minister of Emergency Situations
Ivan Isakov (1894–1967), Admiral of the Fleet of the Soviet Union, Soviet Navy
Sergei Khudyakov (1902–1950), Marshal of Aviation, Soviet Air Force
Sergey Kurginyan (b. 1949), political scientist
Ivan Lazarev (1820–1879), lieutenant general of the Imperial Russian Army
Sergey Lavrov (b. 1950), Foreign Minister of Russia since 2004
Mikhail Loris-Melikov (1825–1888), General of the Cavalry, Minister of Interior of Russia in 1880–1881
Valerian Madatov (1782–1829), prince, a lieutenant-general of the Russian Empire
Anastas Mikoyan (1895–1978), Soviet statesman and diplomat, First Deputy Chairman of the Council of Ministers of the Soviet Union (second highest figure in the Soviet Union) from 1955 to 1964
Gaik Ovakimian (1898–1967), leading Soviet NKVD spy in the United States
Movses Silikyan (1862–1937), Major General in the Russian Imperial Army
Nelson Stepanyan (1913–1944), dive bomber pilot during WWII, two times hero of USSR
Gevork Vartanian (1924–2012), legendary Soviet spy
Saak Karapetyan (1960–2018), Russian deputy attorney general

Scientists

Evgeny Abramyan (1930–2014), physicist, one of the founders of several research directions in the Soviet and Russian nuclear technology
Hovannes Adamian (1879–1932), engineer, one of the founders of color television
Sergei Adian (1931–2020), one of the most prominent Soviet mathematicians
Tateos Agekian (1913–2006), astrophysicist, a pioneer of stellar dynamics
Sos Alikhanian (1906–1985), geneticist, one of the founders of molecular genetics in the USSR, founder of the State Research Institute of Genetics (GosNIIgenetika)
Abram Alikhanov (1904–1970), nuclear physicist, one of the founders of nuclear physics in USSR, founder of Institute for Theoretical and Experimental Physics (ITEP)
Victor Ambartsumian (1908–1996), astrophysicist, one of the founders of theoretical astrophysics
Gurgen Askaryan (1928–1997), physicist, inventor of light self focusing
Boris Babayan (b. 1933), computer scientist, father of supercomputing in the former Soviet Union and Russia, founder of Moscow Center of SPARC Technologies (MCST)
Mikhail Chailakhyan (1902–1991), founder of hormonal theory of plant development
Artur Chilingarov (b. 1939), polar explorer, member of the State Duma from 1993 to 2011
 (1903–1965), major general of engineering, head of the KB-1 which created the first anti-aircraft missile defense system S-25 Berkut
Bagrat Ioannisiani (1911–1985), designer of the BTA-6, one of the largest telescopes in the world
Andronik Iosifyan (1905–1993), aerospace engineer, chief electrician of Soviet missiles and spacecraft, including the R-7 Semyorka and the Soyuz spacecraft
Alexander Kemurdzhian (1921–2003), aerospace engineer, designer of the first space exploration rovers for moon and mars
Leonid Khachiyan (1952–2005), mathematician and computer scientist, known for ellipsoid algorithm
Tigran Khudaverdyan (b. 1981), computer scientist, deputy CEO of Yandex
Artem Mikoyan (1905–1970), aerospace engineer, designed many of the famous MiG jet aircraft, founder of Mikoyan Design Bureau
Semyon Kirlian (1898–1978), founder of Kirlian photography; discovered that living matter is emitting energy fields
Ivan Knunyants (1906–1990), chemist, a major developer of the Soviet chemical weapons program
Samvel Kocharyants (1909–1993), nuclear scientist, developer of nuclear warheads for ballistic missiles
Sergey Mergelyan (1928–2008), mathematician, made major contributions to the Approximation Theory
Yuri Oganessian (b. 1933), nuclear physicist in the Joint Institute for Nuclear Research (JINR), the world's leading researcher in superheavy elements
Leon Orbeli (1882–1958), founder of evolutionary physiology
Yuri Osipyan (1931–2008), physicist who worked in the field of solid state physics
Mikhail Pogosyan (b. 1956), aerospace engineer, general director of Sukhoi and the United Aircraft Corporation (UAC)
 (1944–2010), theoretical physicist, director of JINR from 2006–2010
Norair Sisakian (1907–1966), biochemist, a founder of space biology; pioneer in biochemistry of sub-cell structures and technical biochemistry
Karen Ter-Martirosian (1922–2005), theoretical physicist, known for his contributions to quantum mechanics and quantum field theory, founder of the Elementary Particle Physics chair of the MIPT

Sports

Artur Dalaloyan (b. 1996), artistic gymnast, 2018 World All-Around Champion
Artur Danielian (b. 2003), 2018 World Junior silver medalist, men's singles figure skater
Yana Egorian (b. 1993), 2016 Olympic Champion in women's individual sabre
Robert Emmiyan (b. 1965), fourth best long jumper in history, holder of European record
Arsen Galstyan (b. 1989), judoka, 2012 Olympic champion
Margarita Gasparyan (b. 1994), singles tennis player
Karen Khachanov, (b. 1996), singles tennis player
Evgenia Medvedeva (b. 1999), 2018 Olympic silver medalist, 2 time World Champion, ladies' singles figure skater (father's side)
Grigory Mkrtychan (1925–2003), ice hockey player and coach, 1956 Olympic champion
Erast Osipyan (born 1965), footballer 
Nikita Simonyan (b. 1926), football player and coach, first vice-president of the Russian Football Union (RFS)
Seda Tutkhalyan (b. 1999), artistic gymnast, 2016 Olympic team silver medalist
Yurik Vardanyan (1956–2018), weightlifter, set several world records
Arsen Zakharyan (b. 2003), footballer

Miscellaneous

Ara Abrahamyan (b. 1957), businessman 
 (b. 1959), entrepreneur
Gabriel El-Registan (1899–1945), poet, co-author of the Anthem of the Soviet Union
Pavel Florensky (1882–1937), orthodox theologian, philosopher, mathematician, electrical engineer, and inventor
Sergey Galitsky (b. 1967), businessman, founder and co-owner of Magnit, Russia's largest retailer
Karo Halabyan (1897–1959), architect, executive secretary of Union of Soviet Architects
Garry Kasparov (b. 1963), world chess champion, considered by many to be the greatest chess player of all time
Miron Merzhanov (1895–1975), personal architect of Joseph Stalin
Tigran Petrosian (1929–1984), chess grandmaster, world chess champion from 1963 to 1969
Photios I of Constantinople (810–893), orthodox patriarch, central figure in the Christianization of Kievan Rus', one of the founders of the Russian Orthodox Church
Margarita Simonyan (b. 1980), journalist, editor-in-chief of the television news network RT (Russia Today)
Artyom Tarasov (1950–2017), businessman, first millionaire in the USSR
 (b. 1955), banker, president of Association of Russian Banks
Ruben Vardanian (b. 1968), businessman, CEO of Troika Dialog

See also
List of Armenian churches in Russia
Russians in Armenia

References
Notes
	

References

Bibliography

External links
 Armenian Embassy in the Russian Federation
 The Herald of Armenians in Petersburg
 Official site of Armavir, Russia
 Armenian Cemetery in Moscow

 
Ethnic groups in Russia
 
Oriental Orthodoxy in Russia